Clemons is an unincorporated community and coal town in Perry County, Kentucky, United States. Their Post Office  has been closed. Sgt. Woodrow W. Shepherd who was killed in action at the Battle of Iwo Jima is buried in the Shepherd Family Cemetery nearby.

References

Unincorporated communities in Perry County, Kentucky
Unincorporated communities in Kentucky
Coal towns in Kentucky